Marcos Vianna Caruso (born 22 February 1952) is a Brazilian actor, screenwriter, playwright, and stage director.

He graduated in Law from the Law School of Largo de São Francisco. He is the author of several plays written in partnership with the actress and author Jandira Martini.

He was married for twenty years to the actress Jussara Freire, mother of his two children: Caetano Caruso and Mari Caruso.

His first work as an author was an adaptation of a work by Monteiro Lobato for a TV Globo show.

Filmography

Film
1978: O Bem Dotado - O Homem de Itu
1979: Viúvas Precisam de Consolo
1996: Um Céu de Estrelas
2001: Memórias Póstumas .... Quincas Borba
2002: Lara .... Apresentador da Rádio
2004: Capital Circulante
2005: Depois Daquele Baile .... Otávio
2006: Irma Vap - O Retorno .... Otávio Gonçalves
2008: Polaróides Urbanas .... Adalberto
2010: Cilada.com .... Father of the bride
2012: O Diário de Tati ..... Father of Tati
2014: Sorria, Você Está Sendo Filmado .... Real estate agent
2015: Operações Especiais .... Fróes
2015: O Escaravelho do Diabo .... Pimentel
2016: Desculpe o Transtorno .... Miguel
2018: Crô em Família .... Seu Peru
2020: Predestinado .... Padre Anselmo

Television

1978: Aritana .... Marcolino
1978: Roda de Fogo1981: Floradas na Serra .... Gumercindo Cordeiro Leitão
1981: Vento do Mar Aberto .... Rafael
1982: A Filha do Silêncio1984: Jerônimo .... Dr. Otoniel
1990: Pantanal .... Tião
1990: O Canto das Sereias .... Hélio
1990: A História de Ana Raio e Zé Trovão .... locutor de rodeios
1991: O Fantasma da Ópera .... Ronald Figueiredo
1994: Éramos Seis .... Virgulino
1995: Sangue do Meu Sangue .... Conde Giorgio de La Fontana
1998: Serras Azuis .... Dr. Rivaldino Paleólogo
2001: Presença de Anita .... Gonzaga
2002: Coração de Estudante .... Dr. Raul Gouvêia
2003: Mulheres Apaixonadas .... Carlão (Carlos de Souza Duarte)
2004: Como uma Onda .... Dr. Prata
2005: Sob Nova Direção .... Ivan Pitanga
2006: Páginas da Vida .... Alex (Alexandre Flores)
2007: Desejo Proibido .... Padre Inácio Gouvêia
2008: Casos e Acasos .... Adauto
2008: Três Irmãs .... Dr. Alcides Áquila
2009: Dilemas de Irene .... Seu Cléber
2010: Tempos Modernos .... Otto Niemann
2010: O Relógio da Aventura .... Neco
2011: Cordel Encantado .... Patácio Peixoto
2012: Avenida Brasil .... Leleco Araújo
2013: O Canto da Sereia .... Juracy Bandeira
2014: Joia Rara .... Arlindo Pacheco
2015: A Regra do Jogo ...... Feliciano Stewart
2017: Pega Pega .... Pedro Guimaraes

Author
Television
1981: Casa de Irene1981: Dona Santa1982: A Filha do Silêncio1982: Campeão1983: Braço de Ferro1990: A História de Ana Raio e Zé Trovão (principal author)
1996: Brava Gente (in partnership with Jandira Martini)

Cinema
1992: Sua Excelência o Candidato2005: O Casamento de Romeu e Julieta2006: Trair e Coçar É só Começar''

Notes

External links
 

1952 births
Living people
Male actors from São Paulo
Brazilian people of Italian descent
Brazilian male film actors
Brazilian male telenovela actors